Association football is among the most popular sports in Africa, with eight members of the Confederation of African Football having competed at the sport's biggest international event, the FIFA Women's World Cup. The highest ranked result in the Women's World Cup for an African team is quarter-finals in the 1999 FIFA Women's World Cup by Nigeria.

Overview

Results

Most finishes in the top four
None

Team results by tournament
Legend

 — Champions
 — Runners-up
 — Third place
 — Fourth place
QF — Quarter-finals
R2 — Round 2
R1 — Round 1

Q — Qualified for upcoming tournament
TBD — To be determined (may still qualify for upcoming tournament)
 — Qualified but withdrew
 — Did not qualify
 — Did not enter / Withdrew / Banned
 — Hosts
 — Not affiliated in FIFA

The team ranking in each tournament is according to FIFA. The rankings, apart from the top four positions, are not a result of direct competition between the teams; instead, teams eliminated in the same round are ranked by their full results in the tournament. In recent tournaments, FIFA has used the rankings for seedings for the final tournament draw.

For each tournament, the number of teams in each finals tournament (in brackets) are shown.

Tournament standings

Overall team records
As per statistical convention in football, matches decided in extra time are counted as wins and losses, while matches decided by penalty shoot-outs are counted as draws. 3 points per win, 1 point per draw and 0 points per loss.

Results through 2019 FIFA Women's World Cup

Appearances

Ranking of teams by number of appearances

Team debuts

Summary of performance
This table shows the number of countries represented at the Women's World Cup, the number of entries (#E) from around the world including any rejections and withdrawals, the number of African entries (#A), how many of those African entries withdrawn (#A-) before/during qualification or were rejected by FIFA, the African representatives at the Women's World Cup finals, the number of World Cup Qualifiers each African representative had to play to get to the World Cup (#WCQ), the furthest stage reached, results, and coaches.

Not yet qualified
46 of the 54 active FIFA and CAF members have never appeared in the final tournament.

Legend
 TBD — To be determined (may still qualify for upcoming tournament)
 — Did not qualify
 — Did not enter / Withdrew / Banned
 — Not affiliated in FIFA
 — Qualified, but withdrew before Finals

Competitive history

1991: disappointing debut
With the first FIFA Women's World Cup in China, Nigeria became the only African representative in the tournament, having won the inaugural 1991 African Women's Championship after beating Cameroon. In the first World Cup for Africa's only representative, Nigeria had a disappointing show. Being drawn with Germany, Italy and Chinese Taipei in group C, Nigeria were completely obliterated in the tournament, with a heavy loss to Germany 0–5 and two hard-fought losses to Italy 0–1 and Chinese Taipei 0–2. Nigeria left the tournament pointless and goalless, which left Africa little to demonstrate at the women's world stage.

1995: first point, but still the same
In the edition four years later in Sweden, the Nigerians were again Africa's only representative after beating South Africa in the final of the 1995 African Women's Championship. Drawn with Canada, England and eventual champions Norway, Nigeria finally achieved its first point, a 3–3 draw with North American opponent Canada; but defeats to England and especially, the heavy loss to Norway 0–8, sent Nigeria to bottom of the group, with Africa still failed to impress at the women's world stage.

1999: historic win and record debutants
By reaching the final of the 1998 African Women's Championship, Nigeria and Ghana qualified for the World Cup held in the United States, with the latter being the historic debut. This World Cup marked for the first time, Nigeria managed to progress from the group stage, with two wins against debutant North Korea and European opponent Denmark proved the difference, making their heavy loss 1–7 to the United States only a temporary setback in Nigeria's success. The Nigerians then played all out against South American powerhouse Brazil, which saw Nigeria lost 3–4 due to a golden goal in extra time, making this World Cup Nigeria's most successful up to date. Ghana, on the other hand, was not successful, only acquired one point in the group stage, a 1–1 draw against Australia, with two heavy losses to China and Sweden condemned Ghana to bottom of the group D.

2003: same participants but with disappointment
After the 1999 phenomenon, Nigeria and Ghana returned to the United States for the 2003 edition, hoping to repeat the same feat. However, the return proved to be a nightmare, with Nigeria found itself in group A against hosts and defending champions United States, alongside European giant Sweden and rising Asian power North Korea; Nigeria were totally humiliated after losing all three matches and conceding 11, scoring none, the first time since 1991 that Nigeria could not score a goal. Ghana was more impressive a bit in group D, earning a historic win against old foe Australia 2–1, but two earlier losses to China and Russia prevented Ghana from progressing.

2007: same participants, with only worse performance
The 2007 edition held in China was the most disappointing performance for both Nigeria and Ghana, Africa's only representatives for a third consecutive time. Drawn in group B and, like 2003, again facing the United States, Sweden and North Korea, the Nigerians did a better work by holding Sweden 1–1, but defeats to North Korea and the United States condemned the Super Falcons to bottom place. Ghana, meanwhile, did even worse, losing all three games in group C, against Australia 1–4, Canada 0–4 and Norway 2–7, and ended up in bottom place as well. With only a point gained, Africa once again failed to impress at the women's stage.

2011: change of debutant, but same old results
The 2011 World Cup in Germany marked the absent of Ghana – the two African representatives were Nigeria and Equatorial Guinea. Like 2003 and 2007, neither Nigeria and Equatorial Guinea could barely perform at its full extent in the competition as well. In Group A, Nigeria faced up against the hosts, powerhouse and then-world champions Germany, rising European power France and North American foe Canada; all what Nigeria could do was a win against Canada 1–0, while defeats with the same scoreline to Germany and France ended any automatic progression hope for the Super Falcons. Equatorial Guinea were drawn in group D, and faltered in the group stage with three straight defeats, although it did perform bravely against European giant Norway and Asian powerhouse Australia, losing just by one-goal margin before getting thumped 0–3 by Brazil.

2015: historic debutants record and Africa's first roar in 16 years
The tournament in Canada witnessed Nigeria joining two new debutants, Cameroon and Ivory Coast, heading to the competition. Nigeria, drawn in group D, found itself in a tough situation against giants United States and Sweden, as well as Asian powerhouse Australia; all what Nigeria could do was an exciting 3–3 draw to Sweden, before two defeats to the Matildas and the Americans ended any hope to progress again. Ivory Coast, drawn with Germany, Norway and Thailand in group B, did terribly worse, including the 0–10 record loss to Germany, and finished last with no point. Ange N'Guessan was the Ivorians' main phenomenon, with her goal against Norway being nominated as one of the best in the tournament.

The other debutant, Cameroon, had done an exceptionally brilliant job as Nigeria and Ivory Coast failed. Being drawn in group C with Switzerland, Ecuador and world champions Japan, Cameroon impressed with two wins over Ecuador 6–0 and Switzerland 2–1, finished second and progressed to the knockout stage, where the Indomitable Lionesses lost to China 0–1 in the last sixteen. Nonetheless, Cameroon's success meant the Cameroonians became the second team in Africa to progress from the group stage, and the first to do so in 16 years.

2019: history written for Africa
France 2019 saw Nigeria, Cameroon and debutant South Africa took part in the tournament as Africa's representatives. This tournament was historic for the continent — for the first time, two African teams booked places in the knockout stage. Nigeria were drawn in group A with hosts France, Norway and South Korea; the Super Falcons disappointed with two losses to France and Norway, but a necessary 2–0 win over Asian representative South Korea gave Nigeria third place, in which it ultimately progressed thanked to Chile's failure to score more than two goals against Thailand. Cameroon, meanwhile, had a hard time in a tough group with rising European power Netherlands and North American foe Canada, with Cameroon losing both games despite putting brave fights, it was only by the late goal from Ajara Nchout against New Zealand that Cameroon finally booked a place in the last sixteen as one of the best third-placed team. Both Nigeria and Cameroon went to crash out of that stage, losing to Germany and England with the same 0–3 scoreline.

South Africa, meanwhile, was Africa's only representative to fail to progress, although the draw had put South Africa to face sterner opponents. South Africa lost to Spain 1–3 after Thembi Kgatlana stunned with a goal lead in the first half, before falling to China and Germany 0–1 and 0–4 together.

2023: record debutants and greater expectation
With the edition in Australia and New Zealand, the World Cup was expanded to 32 teams. Nigeria and South Africa, having participated in 2019 edition, will return to the World Cup in 2023, joined by two new debutants, Zambia and Morocco.

References

External links

 
Association football in Africa
FIFA Women's World Cup records and statistics